Aunt Sally were an avant-punk-psychedelic-rock group from Osaka in Japan, active in the late 1970s.
Members besides creative heads Phew (vocals) and Bikke (guitars, vocals) Kataoka (bass guitar), Takashi Maruyama (drums) and Mayu (keyboards).

Lead Singer Phew later earned some underground popularity when working with members of D.A.F, Einstürzende Neubauten and Can.

Discography (partial) 
 2002 Undo Records (CD) UNDO-001 
 2001 Live 1978–1979 P-Vine Records (CD) PCD-5629
 1984 Joystick (LP) Kojima 
 1979 Aunt Sally Vanity Records (LP)0003-A

External links 
 
 
 Aunt Sally at Forced Exposure

Japanese punk rock groups